Ángel Fabián Di María (born 14 February 1988) is an Argentine professional footballer who plays for  club Juventus and the Argentina national team. He can play as either a winger or attacking midfielder. Known for his trickery, rapid pace and agility, Di María is considered to be one of the greatest players of his generation and one of the greatest Argentine players of all time.

Di María began his career with Rosario Central but came into prominence at Benfica after signing for the club in 2007, aged 19. He helped Benfica win the Primeira Liga, the club's first league title in five years, and two Taça da Liga titles. In 2010, Di María moved to Spanish club Real Madrid in a transfer worth €25 million, where he won a 2011–12 La Liga title and the 2013–14 UEFA Champions League. He subsequently signed for Manchester United in 2014 in a then-British record deal worth £59.7 million (€75.6 million), but left a year later to join Paris Saint-Germain. In France, Di María won five league titles, five Coupe de France and four Coupe de la Ligue, which includes three domestic quadruples, and helped the club reach its first Champions League final in 2020. He is also the club's ninth-highest goalscorer and all-time leader in assists. He joined Italian side Juventus for free in the summer of 2022.

Di María debuted for Argentina internationally in 2007, playing for the Argentina under-20 team; with the team, he won the 2007 FIFA U-20 World Cup, held in Canada. Playing for the country's Olympic team at the 2008 Olympic Games, Di María scored the winning goal against Nigeria in the final to win Argentina their second successive Olympic gold medals in football. He made his senior debut for Argentina the same year, in 2008, at the age of 20, and has since earned over 125 caps, including appearing in nine major tournaments; he has featured in four FIFA World Cups for Argentina; helping his country reach the final in 2014 and win their third World Cup in 2022, the first in 36 years, scoring the second goal in the final. Furthermore, Di María has also been part of the Argentina squads that have reached three different Copa América finals, in 2015, 2016 and 2021, winning the last one, with him netting the only goal in the final to win Argentina their first trophy in 28 years.

Early life 
Di María was born on 14 February 1988 in Rosario, Santa Fe, as one of three children of Miguel di María and Diana Hernandez, and grew up in Perdriel. As an infant, he was unusually active, and on recommendation of a doctor was signed up for football at age three. He also helped his parents with their work at a local coal yard along with his two sisters, Vanesa and Evelyn. Due to the low income his family earned, purchasing football boots and keeping up with Di María's hobby was difficult for his parents. He considers himself to be a "family man" and has used a significant amount of his salary to "give back" to his family. After being transferred to Benfica, he asked his father not to work any more and purchased a house for his parents and sisters.

Club career

Rosario Central 
At age four, Di María joined Rosario Central. As he had already committed to playing for his local club, Torito, 35 footballs were given in compensation.

Di María made his professional debut on 14 December 2005 in Rosario's final fixture of the Apertura, a 2–2 draw away to Independiente, by replacing Emiliano Vecchio. He scored for the first time on 24 November 2006 in the following season's Apertura in a 4–2 win at home over Quilmes, a minute after replacing Leonardo Borzani at half-time. After playing at the 2007 FIFA U-20 World Cup in Canada, Boca Juniors made a bid of US$6.5 million for him. He was also approached by English club Arsenal, a move that fell through due to the United Kingdom's strict rules on issuing work permits to players from outside the European Union.

Benfica 

Di María was transferred to Portuguese side Benfica in July 2007, where he played as a winger. He was signed as a replacement for Benfica's departing captain, Simão, who joined Atlético Madrid earlier that summer. Benfica paid Rosario Central €6 million for 80% of his sports rights and 50% of sports right of Andrés Díaz. Later, in August 2008, the Portuguese club paid an extra €2 million for the remaining 20%, but re-sold 10% to GestiFute.

Di María signed a new deal with Benfica in October 2009, adding three more years to his current deal, which was to last until 30 June 2015 with his release fee set at a minimum of €40 million. Later that month, he was backed by Diego Maradona to become "Argentina's next superstar".

On 27 February 2010, Di María scored his first hat-trick in a classic 4–0 win against Leixões. The next day, he made the headlines as "Magic Tri María" in all sports newspapers in Portugal.

Real Madrid

2010–11: Debut season 
On 28 June 2010, Real Madrid posted on their website that they had come to terms with Benfica for the transfer of Di María. He signed a five-year contract for €25 million, plus €11 million in incentives, as announced one day later by the Portuguese Stock Exchange regulating entity. On 7 July 2010, Di María arrived to Madrid directly from Buenos Aires, and passed the medical test on 8 July.

He made his debut on 4 August 2010 in a friendly match against Mexican side América, which Real Madrid won 3–2. On 22 August, Di María scored his first goal in another friendly away against Hércules, which Real Madrid won 1–3. In the last match of the pre-season, on 24 August, after an individual play described as a "magic moment", he opened the score of the 2–0 win against Peñarol for the Trofeo Santiago Bernabéu.

His league debut came on 29 August in a 0–0 draw against Mallorca. On 18 September, Di María scored his first league goal for Real Madrid in their 1–2 away win over Real Sociedad. Ten days later, he scored his first goal in the UEFA Champions League against Auxerre in a 0–1 victory. He scored a controversial first goal against Sevilla on 19 December. Days later, Di María assisted Karim Benzema's two goals and Cristiano Ronaldo's goal in an astonishing 8–0 drubbing of Levante on 22 December. In the second leg of the Champions League round of 16 against Lyon, he scored the third and final goal in a 3–0 win to send Real Madrid through to the quarter-finals for the first time in seven years.

Di María scored Real Madrid's third goal during their first-leg Champions League quarter-final victory over Tottenham Hotspur on 5 April 2011. On 20 April, he was sent off in the 31st minute of extra time in the Copa del Rey final against rival Barcelona. Real Madrid won the match 1–0, the lone goal of the match (in the 13th minute of extra time) being a header from Cristiano Ronaldo, which came from his cross, thus obtaining his first honour with Real Madrid.

2011–12: La Liga win 
During the start of the 2011–12 season, Di María endured a tough series of matches as he struggled to adapt to the pace of the league following the summer break. As a result, Di María's early performance for the season was mixed with moments of genuinely good play interspersed with moments of sheer madness by the Argentine. This point was well illustrated during Real Madrid's 1–0 defeat to Levante, a match which saw a clearly out-of-sorts Di María commit a horror foul on Levante's Juanfran during the match. Di María caused the two teams to clash and an on-field incident ensued. However, Di María's performances would improve, including opening up a significant gap at the top of the assists table. From October 2011, Di María was being picked by Madrid head coach José Mourinho ahead of Kaká and Mesut Özil, a sign of his improving form.

On 27 November 2011, Di María played 60 minutes in a league match against city rivals Atlético Madrid, in which he scored a goal for Real Madrid. Mourinho's team won the match 4–1. On 3 December 2011, Di María scored Real's first goal from a sharp angle in a 3–0 defeat of Sporting de Gijón in La Liga. He was a constant threat and presence in the starting XI as Real Madrid won their 32nd league title, playing in their 3–0 win over Athletic Bilbao that clinched the league title.

2012–14: La Décima and Copa del Rey title 

Di María scored his first goal of the season against Barcelona in the first leg of the 2012 Supercopa de España at Camp Nou after a mistake by Barcelona goalkeeper Víctor Valdés.

Although Di María did not have the best season, he did contribute in big moments, most notably by sending in the cross for Cristiano Ronaldo's goal against Manchester United on 13 February, he registered seventeen assists, and scored nine goals throughout the season in 52 appearances, notably against Atlético Madrid and Málaga. On 9 August 2012, Di María signed a new contract with Real Madrid, keeping him at the club until 2018.

On 2 October 2013, Di María scored two goals against Copenhagen in Real Madrid's 4–0 Champions League victory over them. Later in the season, due to tactical decisions by the club's new manager Carlo Ancelotti, Di María's playing position was permanently switched to that of an offensive–minded central midfielder, and he was frequently deployed in the starting line-up alongside Luka Modrić and Xabi Alonso in midfield in the team's 4–3–3 formation. He contributed to the club's 1–2 victory over Barcelona in the 2014 Copa del Rey Final with the opening goal. Di María was the top assist maker in La Liga for the season, contributing 17.

In the 2014 UEFA Champions League Final against Atlético Madrid on 24 May 2014, Di María dribbled past two players before producing a save from goalkeeper Thibaut Courtois. Di María's teammate Gareth Bale, was there to head the rebound into the net in the 110th minute, giving Real Madrid a 2–1 lead over Atlético in an eventual 4–1 win. Di María was named man of the match by UEFA after the match, and was presented with the honour by former Manchester United head coach Sir Alex Ferguson.

Di María was an unused substitute as Real Madrid won the 2014 UEFA Super Cup against Sevilla on 12 August. A week later, in the first leg of the Supercopa de España, he played the final 15 minutes of a 1–1 home draw against Atlético Madrid in place of Luka Modrić.

Manchester United 
On 26 August 2014, Di María signed a five-year deal with Manchester United for a transfer fee of £59.7 million, one of the most expensive transfers of all time and the highest fee ever paid by a British club at the time. He inherited the number 7 shirt at United, which was previously worn by club legends such as George Best, Bryan Robson, Eric Cantona, David Beckham and Cristiano Ronaldo. However, he said in an open letter to Real Madrid fans that he had never wanted to leave Real Madrid, but that its board had been unsupportive and unfair: "Someone may not like me".

Di María made his debut on 30 August in a 0–0 draw with Burnley, in which he was substituted for Anderson after 70 minutes. He scored his first goal for United on 14 September, netting directly from a free-kick in a 4–0 win over Queens Park Rangers. He also provided an assist for Juan Mata's goal in the same match, winning the vote for Man of the Match. His performance was highlighted by Sky Sports' Player Cam feature, which was brought back especially for the match. In the next match, against Leicester City on 21 September, he again scored a goal and provided another assist, although United lost the match 5–3.

On 2 October, Di María won Manchester United's Player of the Month award for September after recording two goals and two assists in his first four matches for the club. One week later, he won his second individual trophy at United after his goal against Leicester, in which he chipped goalkeeper Kasper Schmeichel, was voted as the club's Goal of the Month for September. Di María continued his run of fine form on 5 October by scoring a goal and providing an assist for Radamel Falcao to help United defeat Everton 2–1. Di María was substituted with a hamstring injury 13 minutes into United's 3–0 defeat of Hull City on 29 November and subsequently made only one substitute appearance in the team's next seven matches.

On 4 January 2015, Di María returned from injury to score a late goal in a 0–2 win against Yeovil Town in the third round of the FA Cup. A week later, he was used as a forward by manager Louis van Gaal in a 0–1 home defeat to Southampton. This new role came in the midst of a bad run of form for Di María, who was said to have struggled since October. Di María was sent off on 9 March as United lost 1–2 at home against Arsenal in the FA Cup sixth round, being booked for diving and for grabbing the shirt of referee Michael Oliver, but earlier set up the equaliser by Wayne Rooney.

At the season's end, Di María was judged by The Daily Telegraph to be the worst signing of the season.

Paris Saint-Germain

2015–16: Transfer and domestic quadruple 

On 25 July 2015, Di María failed to board a flight to the United States to join Manchester United's pre-season tour as scheduled; manager Louis van Gaal said he "did not know why". On 2 August, it was reported Di María would undergo a medical ahead of a move to Paris Saint-Germain; and four days later, Manchester United confirmed he had been sold to the French champions for an undisclosed fee, believed to be around £44 million, signing a four-year contract.

Di María made his Ligue 1 debut on 30 August away to Monaco as a 66th-minute substitute for Lucas, and assisted Ezequiel Lavezzi for the final goal of a 0–3 win at the Stade Louis II. On 15 September, Di María scored his first goal for PSG on his UEFA Champions League debut for the club, a 2–0 win over Malmö FF at the Parc des Princes. Seven days later, he registered his first goal in Ligue 1 as PSG defeated Guingamp 3–0. On 23 April 2016, Di María scored the winning goal for PSG in the 2016 Coupe de la Ligue Final against Lille at the Stade de France. Di María ended 2015–16 setting a new Ligue 1 record for assists in a season with 18.

2016–2020: Sustained domestic success and European final 
In the 2016–17 Champions League group stage home match against Basel on 19 October 2016, Di María scored the opening goal in the 40th minute in a 3–0 victory for PSG to register his first goal of the season. On 19 November, he opened the scoring with his first Ligue 1 goal of the season in a 2–0 home win against Nantes.

On 14 February 2017, Di María scored a brace as PSG defeated Barcelona 4–0 in the first leg of 2016–17 UEFA Champions League round of 16 at the Parc des Princes. On 1 April, he scored in PSG's 4–1 win over Monaco in the 2017 Coupe de la Ligue Final. On 8 May 2018, he played as PSG won 2–0 against Les Herbiers to clinch the 2017–18 Coupe de France.

On the first leg of his side's Champions league round of 16 tie against his former club Manchester United in the 2018–19 season, Di María sustained a serious injury following a tackle from Ashley Young; however, he refused to be substituted, and in the final moments of the game, he assisted Kylian Mbappé's goal for a 0–2 win at Old Trafford. Eventually, PSG lost 3–1 in the second leg and were eliminated in the round of 16 for the third consecutive season.

In the 2019–20 UEFA Champions League group stage, Di María scored a brace in a 3–0 win over his former club Real Madrid on 18 September 2019. On 18 August 2020, Di María scored a goal and recorded two assists in PSG's 3–0 Champions League semi-final victory over RB Leipzig; the club went on to play against Bayern Munich in the final, but lost the match 1–0.

2020–2022: Assist record and departure 
On 23 September 2020, Di María was handed a four-match suspension for a spitting incident with Álvaro González during Le Classique 10 days earlier. He would miss the league matches against Angers, Nîmes, Dijon and Nantes. In a UEFA Champions League match against RB Leipzig on 4 November, Di María scored the opening goal in an eventual 2–1 defeat. He made his return to league action in a match against Rennes three days later, and scored a goal to help PSG win the match 3–0.

In a home match against İstanbul Başakşehir on 9 December 2020, Di María recorded two assists; he subsequently became the player with the third most assists in UEFA Champions League history with a tally of 32, only being behind Lionel Messi and Cristiano Ronaldo. On 12 March 2021, Di María extended his contract with Paris Saint-Germain for one more season with an option for a second. On 4 May, Di María was sent off against Manchester City in the semi-finals of the Champions League for stamping on Fernandinho in an off the ball incident. He was handed a three-match ban in European competitions. In the 2021 Coupe de France Final, when PSG defeated Monaco by a score of 2–0, Di María broke the all-time assist record for PSG by delivering a pass for a Kylian Mbappé goal. It was his 104th assist as a PSG player.

In the 2021–22 season with Paris Saint-Germain, Di María won the Ligue 1 title, his fifth league title with the club. On 20 May 2022, his departure from Paris at the end of his contract was confirmed. In his last match for the club against Metz on 21 May, Di María scored a goal and recorded an assist, helping his team to a 5–0 win. He received a tribute and ovation from the Parc des Princes. Di María ended his spell at PSG with 92 goals and 112 assists in 295 matches.

Juventus 
On 8 July 2022, Di María joined Juventus as a free agent after signing an annual contract. He made his club debut on 15 August, in Juventus's opening match of the Serie A season; he scored the opening goal and later assisted Dušan Vlahović's second goal in an eventual 3–0 home win but was substituted in the second half after sustaining an injury. On 15 September, he made his 100th Champions League appearance, and his debut with Juventus in that competition, in a 2–1 home defeat against his former club Benfica. On 23 February 2023, he scored a hat-trick in a 3–0 away win over Nantes in the Europa League.

International career

2007–2008: Success at youth level 
In 2007, Di María was picked to play for the Argentina under-20 team. He was capped for the 2007 South American U-20 Championship in Paraguay. In 2007, he was called up for the 2007 FIFA U-20 World Cup in Canada. They went on to win the tournament with Di María scoring three goals in the proces
.

On 28 January 2008, Di María and some of his under-20s teammates were called up for the Argentina Olympic football team for the 2008 Beijing Olympics. He scored the extra-time game-winning goal on a pass from Lionel Messi in the 105th minute of his team's 2–1 quarter-final win over the Netherlands. On 23 August, Di María scored the game-winner – a chip over the goalkeeper from the edge of the area – in the 57th minute of Argentina's 1–0 victory against Nigeria to capture their second-straight Olympic gold medal in the final game of the Olympic tournament.

2008–2010: Senior debut and early national team career 

On 6 September 2008, Di María made his debut for the Argentina senior team in a match against Paraguay.

On 19 May 2010, Di María was selected by Argentinian manager Diego Maradona in the 23-man squad for the 2010 FIFA World Cup in South Africa. On 24 May, Di María scored his debut international goal in a 5–0 friendly win over Canada. At the World Cup, he helped Argentina reach the quarter-finals, playing in all five of Argentina's matches and starting four of them.

Following the World Cup, on 11 August 2010 Di María scored the first-ever international goal at Dublin's new Aviva Stadium in a friendly against the Republic of Ireland as Argentina won 0–1.

Di María appeared three times during the 2011 Copa América, scoring once in a 3–0 defeat of Costa Rica in the group stage.

2014–2017: World Cup and Copa América finals 
Di María made 12 appearances during the 2014 FIFA World Cup qualification campaign and was included in the Argentina national team for the tournament finals. In Argentina's round of 16 match against Switzerland, Di María scored the only goal of the game after 118 minutes, from a Lionel Messi assist. During the quarter-final match against Belgium, Di María suffered a muscle tear in the thigh and was later taken off the field. It was later announced after the match that Di María would miss the rest of the tournament due to the injury. He had previously helped to create Gonzalo Higuaín's only goal of the match, which sent Argentina into the semi-finals. Argentina finished the tournament as runners-up to Germany.

On 11 July, Di María was named on the ten-man shortlist for FIFA's Golden Ball award for the tournament's best player.

On 3 September 2014, in a friendly away against world champions Germany, Di María had a part in all four of Argentina's goals in a 2–4 victory, assisting three and scoring one.

On 28 May 2015, Di María was included in Argentina national team for the 2015 Copa América. On 6 June, he was selected to captain the team in the absence of Lionel Messi for a warm-up match against Bolivia, scoring twice in a 5–0 win. A week later, in their opening match of the tournament against Paraguay in La Serena, Di María won a penalty which Messi scored in a 2–2 draw. On 30 June, he scored twice and assisted a goal for Sergio Agüero, as Argentina defeated Paraguay 6–1 to reach the final. He was substituted with a hamstring injury within the first half-hour of the final against hosts Chile, which his team lost in a penalty shootout after a goalless draw.

In Argentina's opening match of the Copa América Centenario on 6 June 2016, a rematch of the previous tournament's final against defending champions Chile, Di María scored the opening goal of the match, and later assisted Éver Banega's goal in a 2–1 win. Di María dedicated the goal to his grandmother, who had recently died. In his nation's second group match, against Panama on 10 June, he assisted Nicolás Otamendi's opening goal, but was later forced off due to injury. Argentina won the match 5–0. He missed the rest of the tournament due to injury as Argentina reached the Copa América final for the second consecutive time, once again losing out to Chile on penalties, following a 0–0 draw.

2018–2020: World Cup disappointment and Copa América third-place 
Di María made 18 appearances in the 2018 FIFA World Cup qualification campaign. On 22 May 2018, Di María was named in 23-man squad by manager Jorge Sampaoli for the 2018 FIFA World Cup in Russia. On 30 June, he scored a long range goal against France in a 4–3 defeat which saw Argentina eliminated from the World Cup in the Round of 16.

On 21 May 2019, he was included in the Lionel Scaloni final 23-man Argentina squad for the 2019 Copa América.

2021–2022: Copa América and World Cup triumphs 
In June 2021, Di María was included in the Argentina national team for the 2021 Copa América in Brazil. On 21 June, he assisted the only goal of the match, scored by Papu Gómez, in Argentina's third group match against Paraguay; the result allowed his side to progress to the quarter-finals. In the final of the tournament against the hosts Brazil on 10 July, he scored the only goal of the match to give Argentina their joint record 15th Copa América title with Uruguay and their first international title since 1993. He ran onto a long pass from Rodrigo De Paul into the Brazilian penalty area. The pass was slightly deflected by Brazilian defender Renan Lodi before Di María controlled the ball with the outside of his left foot; he then chipped the ball over the goalkeeper Ederson, giving Argentina an early lead. Although he was substituted late in the second half of the match, the goal would hold as the winning effort for Argentina.

On 1 June 2022, Di María scored Argentina's second goal in a 3–0 win over the reigning European champions, Italy, at Wembley Stadium in the 2022 Finalissima.

On 11 November 2022, Di María was named in the final squad for the 2022 FIFA World Cup in Qatar. On 26 November, he recorded an assist on Messi's opening goal in Argentina's second group match, a 2–0 win over Mexico. On 18 December, Di María scored his team's second goal against France in the final, minutes after winning the penalty for the first goal as Argentina defeated France 4–2 on penalties, after the match ended 3–3 in extra-time, to win the World Cup. He was surprised by coach's decision to start him on the left and thought Scaloni was "confused," but Scaloni convinced Di Maria how he wanted to game plan with him specifically on the left.

Style of play 

Di María is a quick, strong, tricky and talented winger who is also capable of playing as a more central attacking midfielder or on either side of the pitch, although he is predominantly a left-footed player. He has also been deployed to great effect as a central midfielder, in particular under Carlo Ancelotti's tenure with Real Madrid. Possessing a slender frame, Di María is an agile, creative and highly technical player who possesses excellent dribbling skills and ball control, as well as great pace, stamina, movement, and acceleration, attributes which allow him to beat players easily in one-on-one situations. He is also gifted with excellent vision, set-piece delivery, passing, and crossing ability, which allow him to function effectively as a playmaker and as an assist provider, although he is also capable of scoring goals himself, and is an accurate free kick taker. Despite not being physically imposing, he is also a very hard-working player, and he improved on the defensive aspect of his game under manager José Mourinho. Despite his ability, he has often struggled with injuries throughout his career.

Personal life 
Di María is nicknamed "Fideo", which means "noodle" in Spanish, due to his slender frame. Being of Italian descent, he holds Italian nationality. He is Roman Catholic.

He married fellow Argentine Jorgelina (née Cardoso) in 2011. Together they have a daughter, Pia, who was born three months premature and survived after treatment at an intensive care unit at the Hospital Universitario Montepríncipe in Madrid.

Di María's home in Prestbury, Cheshire, was the scene of an attempted burglary on 31 January 2015.

On 2 September 2020, it was reported that Di María, along with PSG teammates Neymar and Leandro Paredes, had tested positive for COVID-19. The French sports newspaper L'Équipe said that the three players reportedly went on vacation in Ibiza. As a result, they had to quarantine for one week, and the rest of the players and working staff were scheduled to take a coronavirus test within the same week.

During a match between PSG and Nantes on 14 March 2021, Di María's home was robbed and his family was held hostage. He had been substituted off the pitch by manager Mauricio Pochettino, who informed Di María of the situation. PSG teammate Marquinhos' parents' home was also burgled in a similar way.

Pandora Papers 
Di María is one of the 13 sports personalities named in the Pandora Papers published by the International Consortium of Investigative Journalists (ICIJ). He used a company in Panama to exploit his image rights for months before arriving at Real Madrid. He is the owner of a company in Panama created especially to manage his million-dollar contracts for the exploitation of his image rights, a shell company that he used since 2009 and that he maintains to this day while playing at Paris Saint-Germain with Lionel Messi. The Pandora Papers reveal that he handled more than 8 million euros between 2013 and 2017 through a company named Sunpex Corporation Inc.

Career statistics

Club

International 

Scores and results list Argentina's goal tally first, score column indicates score after each Di María goal.

Honours 
Benfica
 Primeira Liga: 2009–10
 Taça da Liga: 2008–09, 2009–10

Real Madrid
 La Liga: 2011–12
 Copa del Rey: 2010–11, 2013–14
 Supercopa de España: 2012
 UEFA Champions League: 2013–14
 UEFA Super Cup: 2014

Paris Saint-Germain
 Ligue 1: 2015–16, 2017–18, 2018–19, 2019–20, 2021–22
 Coupe de France: 2015–16, 2016–17, 2017–18, 2019–20, 2020–21
 Coupe de la Ligue: 2015–16, 2016–17, 2017–18, 2019–20
 Trophée des Champions: 2016, 2018, 2019, 2020

Argentina U20
 FIFA U-20 World Cup: 2007

Argentina U23
 Olympic Games: 2008

Argentina
 FIFA World Cup: 2022
 Copa América: 2021
 CONMEBOL–UEFA Cup of Champions: 2022

Individual
 Argentine Footballer of the Year: 2014
 FIFA FIFPro World11: 2014
 FIFA World Cup Dream Team: 2014
 IFFHS CONMEBOL team of the decade 2011–2020
 UEFA Team of the Year: 2014
 ESM Team of the Year: 2015–16, 2019–20
 UEFA Champions League Squad of the Season: 2013–14
 SJPF Player of the Month: April 2010
 UNFP Ligue 1 Player of the Month: December 2015
 UNFP Ligue 1 Team of the Year: 2015–16, 2018–19

See also 
 List of footballers with 100 or more caps

References

External links 

Profile at the Juventus F.C. website
 

1988 births
Living people
Argentine Roman Catholics
Argentine people of Italian descent
Argentine sportspeople of Spanish descent
Footballers from Rosario, Santa Fe
Argentine footballers
Association football midfielders
Association football wingers
Rosario Central footballers
S.L. Benfica footballers
Real Madrid CF players
Manchester United F.C. players
Paris Saint-Germain F.C. players
Juventus F.C. players
Argentine Primera División players
Primeira Liga players
La Liga players
Premier League players
Ligue 1 players
Serie A players
UEFA Champions League winning players
Argentina under-20 international footballers
Olympic footballers of Argentina
Argentina international footballers
Footballers at the 2008 Summer Olympics
2010 FIFA World Cup players
2011 Copa América players
2014 FIFA World Cup players
2015 Copa América players
Copa América Centenario players
2018 FIFA World Cup players
2019 Copa América players
2021 Copa América players
2022 FIFA World Cup players
Olympic gold medalists for Argentina
Olympic medalists in football
Medalists at the 2008 Summer Olympics
FIFA World Cup-winning players
Copa América-winning players
Argentine expatriate footballers
Argentine expatriate sportspeople in Portugal
Argentine expatriate sportspeople in Spain
Argentine expatriate sportspeople in England
Argentine expatriate sportspeople in France
Expatriate footballers in Portugal
Expatriate footballers in Spain
Expatriate footballers in England
Expatriate footballers in France
Citizens of Italy through descent
FIFA Century Club
People named in the Pandora Papers